In mathematical analysis, Cesàro summation (also known as the Cesàro mean) assigns values to some infinite sums that are not necessarily convergent in the usual sense. The Cesàro sum is defined as the limit, as n tends to infinity, of the sequence of arithmetic means of the first n partial sums of the series.

This special case of a matrix summability method is named for the Italian analyst Ernesto Cesàro (1859–1906).

The term summation can be misleading, as some statements and proofs regarding Cesàro summation can be said to implicate the Eilenberg–Mazur swindle. For example, it is commonly applied to Grandi's series with the conclusion that the sum of that series is 1/2.

Definition 
Let  be a sequence, and let

be its th partial sum.

The sequence  is called Cesàro summable, with Cesàro sum , if, as  tends to infinity, the arithmetic mean of its first n partial sums  tends to :

The value of the resulting limit is called the Cesàro sum of the series   If this series is convergent, then it is Cesàro summable and its Cesàro sum is the usual sum.

Examples

First example
That is,  is the sequence

Let  denote the series

The series  is known as Grandi's series.

Let  denote the sequence of partial sums of :

This sequence of partial sums does not converge, so the series  is divergent.  However,   Cesàro summable.  Let  be the sequence of arithmetic means of the first  partial sums:

Then

Second example
That is,  is the sequence

Let  now denote the series

Then the sequence of partial sums  is

Since the sequence of partial sums grows without bound, the series  diverges to infinity.  The sequence  of means of partial sums of G is

This sequence diverges to infinity as well, so  is  Cesàro summable. In fact, for any sequence which diverges to (positive or negative) infinity, the Cesàro method also leads to a sequence that diverges likewise, and hence such a series is not Cesàro summable.

summation

In 1890, Ernesto Cesàro stated a broader family of summation methods which have since been called  for non-negative integers .

The higher-order methods can be described as follows: given a series , define the quantities

(where the upper indices do not denote exponents) and define  to be  for the series .

if it exists . This description represents an -times iterated application of the initial summation method and can be restated as

In particular,  are the binomial coefficients of power .

If  has a  sum, then it also has a  sum for every , and the sums agree; furthermore we have  if  (see little- notation).

Cesàro summability of an integral 
Let . The integral  is  summable if

exists and is finite . The value of this limit, should it exist, is the  sum of the integral.  Analogously to the case of the sum of a series, if , the result is convergence of the improper integral.  In the case ,  convergence is equivalent to the existence of the limit

which is the limit of means of the partial integrals.

See also 

 Abel summation
 Abel's summation formula
 Abel–Plana formula
 Abelian and tauberian theorems
 Almost convergent sequence
 Borel summation
 Divergent series
 Euler summation
 Euler–Boole summation
 Fejér's theorem
 Hölder summation
 Lambert summation
 Perron's formula
 Ramanujan summation
 Riesz mean
 Silverman–Toeplitz theorem
 Stolz–Cesàro theorem
 Summation by parts

References

Bibliography

 .
 
 

Summability methods
Means